Graham Palmer (23 January 1921 – December 1994) was a British sprint canoeist, born in London, who competed in the early 1950s. He finished 3rd in the K-2 10,000m event at the 1952 Summer Olympics in Helsinki. He also competed in other events.

Palmer fought in World War II. His account of the conflict is detailed in his memoirs, Prisoner of Death: A Gripping Memoir of Courage and Survival Under the Third Reich He is survived by two sons, a daughter and eight grandchildren.

References

1921 births
1994 deaths
Sportspeople from London
Canoeists at the 1952 Summer Olympics
Olympic canoeists of Great Britain
British male canoeists